The 1998 Finnish Figure Skating Championships took place between December 20 and 21, 1997 in Helsinki. Skaters competed in the disciplines of men's singles, women's singles, and ice dancing. The event was used to help determine the Finnish team to the 1998 European Championships.

Results

Men

Ladies

Ice dancing

External links
 results

1997 in figure skating
Finnish Figure Skating Championships, 1998
Finnish Figure Skating Championships
1997 in Finnish sport
1998 in Finnish sport